The Black Cover is a 1922 German silent film directed by and starring Harry Piel.

The film's art direction was by Willi Herrmann and Albert Korell.

Cast
In alphabetical order

References

Bibliography

External links

1922 films
Films of the Weimar Republic
Films directed by Harry Piel
German silent feature films
German black-and-white films